Meradong may refer to:
Meradong District
Meradong (state constituency), represented in the Sarawak State Legislative Assembly